The men's tandem cycling event at the 1936 Summer Olympics took place on 7 and 8 August and was one of six events at the 1936 Olympics.

Results

Round 1

The winning pair of each heat advanced to the second round. The second-place and third-place pairs were relegated to the repechage for another chance at qualifying.

 Heat 1

 Heat 2

 Heat 3

 Heat 4

 Heat 5

Repechage

The winners of each repechage heat qualified for the second round. The losers were eliminated.

 Repechage 1

 Repechage 2

 Repechage 3

Round 2

The winners of each heat advanced to the semifinals. The losers were eliminated.

 Heat 1

 Heat 2

 Heat 3

 Heat 4

Semifinals

The semifinal winners advanced to the gold medal final. The losers competed in a bronze medal final.

 Semifinal 1

 Heat 2

Finals

Both the gold and bronze medal finals were conducted as best-of-three competitions. In each case, the same team won both of the first two races, making a third race unnecessary.

 Gold medal final

 Bronze medal final

References

 1936 Official Report.

Cycling at the 1936 Summer Olympics
Cycling at the Summer Olympics – Men's tandem
Track cycling at the 1936 Summer Olympics